Eilema catenata is a moth of the subfamily Arctiinae. It was described by Paul Mabille in 1900. It is found on the Comoros and Madagascar.

References

catenata
Moths described in 1900